= StayUncle =

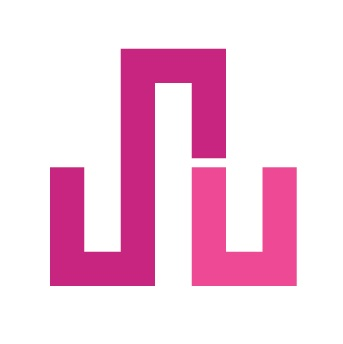
- Type of business: Private
- Founded: 2015
- Headquarters: New Delhi, India
- Founder(s): Sanchit Sethi, Blaze Arizanov
- Industry: Hospitality
- Products: Hotels for couples in India
- Employees: 20
- URL: stayuncle.com
- Current status: Out of Business

StayUncle is a hotel booking website in India for both married and unmarried couples. The site books hotel rooms in 40 Indian cities, who will now allow unmarried couples coming from StayUncle with local ID proof to stay in their properties. The site also allows booking of rooms for 12 hours, rather than the customary 24.

The company was founded in 2014, by Blaze Arizanov and Sanchit Sethi. It initially targeted business and transit travellers, but reoriented towards the young couples' segment at the beginning of 2015. Arizanov is now Chief Marketing Officer; Sethi is chief executive officer.

Investors in the company include Ajay Naqvi, the former country head of Airbnb India.
